Treasury Wine Estates is an Australian global winemaking and distribution business with headquarters in Melbourne. It was formerly the wine division of international brewing company Foster's Group.

History

Background
Treasury Wine Estates traces its roots back to the establishment of several New World wineries in the 19th century. These include  Lindeman's and Penfolds in Australia, and Beringer Vineyards in the United States.

Foster's began to build its wine division from 1995 onwards. Through acquisition, it built the division into one of the world's largest winemakers. By 2005, Beringer Blass was the seventh largest producer of wine in the United States. The same year, Fosters acquired the Australian wine-making group Southcorp, adding famous brands including  Lindeman's, Penfolds and Rosemount, and around A$1 billion to revenues.

However, the wine division performed poorly, often draining cash from the highly profitable brewing business. In 2008, Foster's chief executive officer Trevor O'Hoy resigned. By 2011, the company had written down the value of the wines division by half since it acquired it at the peak of the market, leaving it worth about A$3.1 billion.

Fosters Group brewing and wine split
After further difficulties in the division resulted in an additional A$1.3 billion write-down, 99 per cent of Fosters Group shareholders agreed at a meeting in Melbourne in April 2011 to split Fosters Group business into separate brewing and wine companies. Treasury Wine Estates officially became a separately listed company the following month, with David Dearie as its CEO.

Further write-down of stock worth around A$160 million took place in 2013, followed by the redundancy of David Dearie and appointment of interim chief executive Warwick Every-Burns. This left the business in a more fragile state as shares dropped almost A$2 to just above A$4. Steamrollers crushed millions of bottles of cheap wine to dispose of excess stock in the United States. This eventually led to a class-action by disgruntled shareholders which was settled in 2017.

Treasury has since worked with Accolade Wines to promote bottling efficiency, strengthening its performance in Asia, Australia, New Zealand and Europe.

Appointment of Michael Clarke as CEO
In 2014, the board of directors appointed Michael Clarke, a former food executive with Kraft Foods and Premier Foods, as CEO.

In 2015, Treasury reportedly began reducing its presence in the British market to concentrate on Asia, where margins were much higher. However, later that year Treasury bought the majority of the wine business of London-based multinational Diageo.

In July 2016, Treasury Wine Estates slimmed down its wine portfolio, announcing the sale of 12 cheap wine brands in the United States. The sale of the US brands represented around one million cases of wine.

By 2017, Treasury had begun stockpiling luxury wines and rationing their release in China and the United States. More money was spent marketing the most profitable brands.

In January 2019, Treasury's share price fell dramatically on a slew of news reports and was targeted by short sellers in the markets who accused the company of engaging in illegal practices including "channel stuffing" in attempts to inflate its profits.

Appointment of Tim Ford as CEO
In July 2020, Michael Clarke stood down as CEO and replaced by long-term executive, Tim Ford.

Operations
The business is divided into four regions: (1) Australia and New Zealand, (2) the Americas (i.e. United States and Canada only), (3) Europe (including Latin America), and (4) Asia (including the Middle East and Africa). Globally the company says it has access to more than 13,000 hectares of owned or leased vineyards, with more than 3400 employees, and 36 million cases of wine sold in the 2017 financial year.

In 2013, Treasury Wine had to destroy six million bottle of wines in U.S. due to massive oversupply. The company suffered from a series costly write-downs since its split-off from Fosters. The company was accused of "channel stuffing"- inflating sales by pushing more to wholesalers than they wish.

Treasury Wine tried to capitalize on strong demand of Penfold in China by bundling it with Wolf Blass and Rawson's Retreat. China accounts for half of Treasury's sales in Asia and 80 per cent of its growth in the region, according to a report in 2018. There was a massive supply glut with some distributors in China were said to be sitting on up to three years' worth of stock and deep discounting among wholesalers and retailers. Despite higher taxes and cost of transportation, Rawson's Retreat was selling for less in China than in Australia, some distributors were  even giving it away for free when bundled with premium wine.

Brands

References

External links

 
Food and drink companies established in 2011
Australian companies established in 2011
Manufacturing companies based in Melbourne
Wineries of Australia
Multinational companies headquartered in Australia
Foster's Group
Corporate spin-offs
Companies listed on the Australian Securities Exchange